Dabare Kusum Renuka Liyanage (born January 30, 1961 as කුසුම් රේණු) [Sinhala]), popularly as Kusum Renu, is an actress in Sri Lankan cinema theater and television. She is best known for the role Madhuri in television sitcom Nonavaruni Mahathvaruni and role Vishaka Samaranayake in the film  Dharmayuddhaya.

Personal life
Kusum Renu was born on 30 January 1961 in Colombo and completed her education from Anula Vidyalaya, Nugegoda. At the school times, she was a good sportswoman, a Girl Guide, a school prefect and a member of the school debating team. She also played Esraj for the Eastern Band.

Kusum Renu is married to Sriyantha Mendis, who is also a renowned actor and director. She met Sriyantha during the stage drama Pandukabhaya in 1984 and couple married on 25 October 1986 after the proposal in April 1985. The couple has two daughters. Elder daughter Nipuni Preksha is married to Shan Amanda Perera. Younger daughter Tharuki Amaya also acted in stage play Subha saha Yasa. Her cousin daughter Vidhushi Uththara is also a popular actress in television.

Elder daughter Nipuni specializes in fashion design, costume design, and stage costume design. Her husband Shan is an engineer. Their daughter is Gabriela Kathleen. Second daughter Tharuki completed a NIBM course and studied Human Resources Degree.

Acting career
Renu started acting since school times. Her uncle Senadheera Kuruppu was a popular actor at that time, where she made her public acting debut. Her first role came through T.B. Illangaratne's stage play Sailasanaya. Then she acted many television serials. In 1982 for Mandaram Wahi, Renu won four Certificates of Merit from National Youth Services Council. In the following year, she won a merit award for the role in Deiyange Punchi Akkaraya. In 1984, she won the Best actress award for the role in Hima Kunatuwa.

Renu got the opportunity to play the role of a maid and then the role of a prostitute in Prof. Ediriweera Sarachchandra's play Mahasara. She was given the role of Jane Oyster, the wife of a police officer Oyster Perera, in Sriyantha Mendis' play Sudu Saha Kalu. The uniqueness was that her verbal gesture was limited to three dialogues throughout the play. She also has had the opportunity to play many historical characters in various art forms in recent times: as the queen of King Gajaba in the play Shashree Gajaba created by Vijaya Nandasiri. She also played the role 'Puransina' in the play Rassa Saha Parassa directed by Sriyantha Mendis. Prior to that, Renu acted as 'Lenchina' in Prof. Ariyaratne Kaluarachchi's play Jasaya and Lenchina. She then starred in the later production of Bandula Vithanage's play Romaya Gini Gani. 

After the marriage in 1986, she took a break for the acting. She marked the comeback by winning Best Actress award at the State Drama Festival for the role in Deweni Mahinda in 1998. In 2000, she played the role 'vasuki' in the play Paadada Asapuwa directed by Sriyanatha. The premiere was held here on her birthday, January 30, 2000.

Selected television serials

 Agni Piyapath
 Aluth Gedara
 Anne
 Bandhanaa (2022)
 Damini
 Damsaari (2012)
 Dangamalla (2006) 
 Deiyange Punchi Akkaraya (1983)
 Deydunu Yanaya (2001)
 Doowaru (2012)
 Ethuma
 Gajaman Nona
 Himagira Naga 
 Hima Kunatuwa (1984)
 Hiruta Pipena Sooriyakantha 
 Iththo (2019) 
 Itu Devi Vimana 
 Mandaram Wahi (1982)
 Mathi Nethi Daa (2003) 
 Mini Muthu (2012) 
 Nannaththara (2022) 
 Nil Mal Viyana (2004) 
 Nonavaruni Mahathvaruni as Madhuri (1997)
 Paradeesaya 
 Package (2018)
 Pinkanda Simona 
 Pipi Piyum (2007)
 Prarthana Mal (2010)
 Puja (2002) 
 Raja Bhavana (2003)
 Rankira Soya (2004) 
 Ran Miriwedi
 Ran Sevaneli (2009)
 Ruwan Maliga as Trilicia
 Sanda Numba Nam
 Satharadenek Senpathiyo 
 Sathara Ima Gini 
 Senehase Geethaya (2006)
 Sihina Genena Kumariye (2020)
 Sihina Kumari (2009)
 Sulang Kapolla 
 Visirunu Renu (2008)
 Wassane Sihinaya (2009)
 Wes Muhunu

Selected stage dramas

 Danga Malla (2013)
 Mama Wenama Malak
 Suba Saha Yasa
 Mandaram Wehi (1982)
 Jasaya Saha Lenchina
 Deiyange Punchi Akkaraya (1983)
 Hima Kunatuwa (1984)
 Mahasara
 Raththaran
 Bheema Bhumi
 Ekata Mata Hinahina
 Magul Prastawa
 Ratnawalee
 Padada Asapuwa
 Wellawehum
 Deveni Mahinda (1998)
 Mama Wenama Malak (2011)
 Gebbara Minisa (2011)
 Raassa Paraassa
 Sudu Saha Alu
 Mamai Anduwa (2018)
 Hankithi Dahathuna
 Yathuru Hilen Balanna'

Filmography
Her maiden cinematic experience came through 1979 film Jeewana Kandulu, but was an uncredited role. In 1981, her major cinematic breakthrough was from Sathkulu Pawwa, which gained fame. Some of her popular films are Suhada Koka, Maharaja Gemunu and Dharmayuddhaya.

Awards
Hiru Golden Film Award

|-
|| 2016 ||| Maharaja Gemunu || Best Supporting Actress || 
|-
|| 2018 ||| Dharmayuddhaya'' || Merit Award ||

References

External links
 Tharuki Mendis, Daughter of Shriyantha Mendis and Kusum Renu, Wedding Day Photos
 ඔහු ජීවත් වුණේ අල්ලපු ගෙදර
 East-West Marketing launches Dimbula Kahata tea
 Fiery tickles and heated engagemen

Living people
Sri Lankan film actresses
1961 births
Sinhalese actresses
20th-century Sri Lankan actresses
21st-century Sri Lankan actresses